Josephine Preston Peabody (May 30, 1874 – December 4, 1922) was an American poet and dramatist.

Biography
Peabody was born in New York and educated at the Girls' Latin School, Boston, and at Radcliffe College.

In 1898, she was introduced to fifteen-year-old Khalil Gibran by Fred Holland Day, the American photographer and co-founder of the Copeland-Day publishing house, at an art exhibition. Shortly thereafter Gibran returned to Lebanon but the pair continued to correspond.

From 1901 to 1903, she was instructor in English at Wellesley. The Stratford-on-Avon prize went to her in 1909 for her drama The Piper, which was produced in England in 1910; and in America at the New Theatre, New York City, in 1911. Composer Grace Chadbourne used Peabody's text for her songs "Green Singing Book" and "Window Pane Songs".

On June 21, 1906 she married Lionel Simeon Marks, a British engineer and professor at Harvard University. They had a daughter, Alison Peabody Marks (July 30, 1908 – April 7, 2008), and a son, Lionel Peabody Marks (February 10, 1910 - January 25, 1984).

Selected works
Old Greek Folk Stories Told Anew (1897)
The Wayfarers: A Book of Verse (1898)
Fortune and Men's Eyes: New Poems, with a Play (1900)
In the Silence (1900)
Marlowe (her first play), 
The Singing Leaves; a book of songs and spells (1903)
The Wings (1905), a drama 
The Book of the Little Past (1908)
The Piper: A Play in Four Acts (1909)
The Singing Man (1911), poems
The Wolf of Gubbio (1913)
New Poems (1915)

References

External links 

 
 
 Works by Josephine Preston Peabody at Hathi Trust
 
 January 23, 1916, New York Times: Free Verse Hampers Poets and Is Undemocratic; Josephine Preston Peabody Says That, Nevertheless, the War Is Making Poetry Less Exclusive and the Imagiste Cult Will Be Swept Away
 Poems by Josephine Preston Peabody at English Poetry

1874 births
1922 deaths
19th-century American poets
19th-century American women writers
20th-century American poets
20th-century American women writers
20th-century American dramatists and playwrights
Writers from Boston
Writers from New York City
Radcliffe College alumni
American women poets
American women dramatists and playwrights
Boston Latin Academy alumni